The Turňa is a right tributary of the Bodva river in Slovakia near the border with Hungary. It flows into the Bodva near Turňa nad Bodvou.

References

Rivers of Slovakia